Enad may refer to:

People
 Abdulhameed Enad (born 1995), Qatari football player
 Abdulmajeed Enad (born 1994), Qatari football player
 Abdurahman Enad (born 1996), Qatari football player
 Enad Ličina (born 1979), Serbian boxer
 Thamer Enad (born 1970), Kuwait football manager

Sport clubs in Cyprus
 ENAD Ayiou Dometiou
 ENAD Ayiou Dometiou FC
 ENAD Polis Chrysochous FC

Other
 Enad Global 7, Swedish company